Key West is an unincorporated community in Polk County, in the U.S. state of Minnesota.

History
An old variant name was Bockersville. The present name of Key West may be derived from nearby Keystone Township, according to local history. A post office was established under the name Bockersville in 1892, the name was changed to Keywest in 1896, and the post office was discontinued in 1910.

References

Unincorporated communities in Polk County, Minnesota
Unincorporated communities in Minnesota